The Cușmed is a left tributary of the river Târnava Mică in Romania. It discharges into the Târnava Mică in Sângeorgiu de Pădure.

References

Rivers of Romania
Rivers of Mureș County
Rivers of Harghita County